Pucapuca (possibly from Quechua puka red, the reduplication indicates that there is a group or a complex of something, "a complex of red color") is a  mountain in the Vilcabamba mountain range in the Andes of Peru. It is situated in the Cusco Region, La Convención Province, Santa Teresa District. Pucapuca lies southwest of Choquetacarpo and west of Pumasillo.

References

Mountains of Peru
Mountains of Cusco Region